The American Raptors is a professional rugby union team based in the municipality of Glendale in Colorado. The team plays in the transcontinental Super Rugby Americas competition . Established as the Glendale Raptors in 2006, the team was a founding member of Major League Rugby in 2017, but they played there only three years, competing as the Colorado Raptors in their final shortened season of 2020 before withdrawing from the league.

Following withdrawal from Major League Rugby, the team renamed themselves the Colorado XOs turning their attention to player development of players originally playing other sports, before becoming the American Raptors in 2021.

History 
The Glendale Raptors were founded as an amateur rugby club in 2006. They  won the national  Championship in 2011, and were back-to-back winners of the Pacific Rugby Premiership in 2015 and 2016. 

In 2017, the Raptors were accepted into the professional Major League Rugby competition. The amateur Glendale teams were renamed the Glendale Merlins before the inaugural MLR season in 2018. The Raptors finished the MLR regular season in first place in 2018, but lost the Championship final to Seattle.  In 2019, the Raptors finished the regular season in sixth place and did not play in the finals.  

The team was renamed the Colorado Raptors ahead of the 2020 season but the season was shortened  and eventually cancelled due to impacts of the COVID-19 pandemic.

Withdrawal from Major League Rugby 

On April 9, 2020, the Raptors announced that they would withdraw from Major League Rugby, effective May 2, 2020, the first team to do so. Their announcement explained their withdrawal by saying that "our greater responsibility lies in the development of American players who can win the World Cup for the United States." Asked to explain how the Raptors withdrawing from the league would help to develop American rugby players, Glendale City Manager Linda Cassaday said that MLR had been founded with a core mission of developing American rugby players and originally had limited teams to three foreign players, although this expanded to five players before the first season began in 2018. MLR had expanded from seven teams in 2018 to 12 in 2020 without having enough American players to fill out rosters and had raised the ceiling on foreign players to 10 per team. The Raptors believed that both this overall number of foreign players and the higher proportion of foreign to American players no longer best served the goal of developing American players who could compete successfully in the Rugby World Cup, and therefore chose to withdraw from the league to better focus their efforts on the development of American players who could compete on an international stage.

In June 2022 Raptors played in Challenge Cup of the Americas against Canadians UBC Old Boys Ravens and South Americans Peñarol Rugby and Jaguares XV.

Current squad 
The American Raptors squad for the 2023 Super Rugby Americas season is:

 Senior 15s internationally capped players are listed in bold.

Head coaches
 David Williams (2018–2019)
 Peter Borlase (2019–2020)
 Paul Emerick (2022)
 Sarah Chobot (2023-current)

Captains
 Shaun Davies (2018–2019)
 Luke White (2019–2020)

Records

Season standings

Home field

The team plays at Infinity Park, the first rugby-specific, municipally-owned stadium in the United States.

Sponsorship

Honors
Major League Rugby
Runner-up: 2018
Playoff appearances: 2018

2018 season

° = Preseason game
°° = Playoff Semifinal
°°° = Final at Torero Stadium in San Diego, California

2019 season

Exhibition

Regular season

2020 season

On March 12, 2020, MLR announced the season would go on hiatus immediately for 30 days due to fears surrounding the 2019–2020 coronavirus pandemic. It was cancelled the following week

Regular season

See also
 Glendale Merlins – Formed in 2017, when the club's top side moved to Major League Rugby.
 Denver Stampede – the now defunct PRO Rugby team that played at Infinity Park in Glendale during 2016.

References

External links

 

 

American Raptors
Major League Rugby teams
Rugby union teams in Colorado
Sports teams in Denver
2017 establishments in Colorado
Rugby clubs established in 2017